The dimensions and shape of human vaginas are of great importance in medicine and surgery, in addition to their relevance to sexual pleasure and childbirth; there appears to be no one way, however, to characterize the vagina's size and shape. In addition to variations from individual to individual, the size and shape of a vagina in the baseline state can vary substantially during sexual arousal and intercourse.

Carrying a baby to term, i.e. parity, is associated with a significant increase in the length of the vaginal fornix. The potential effect of parity may be the result of a stretching and elongation of the birth canal at the time of vaginal birth.

There are a number of studies that have been done into the dimensions of the human vagina, but it has not been as intensively researched as human penis size.

Dimensions in the baseline state 

A 1996 study by Pendergrass et al. using vinyl polysiloxane castings taken from the vaginas of 39 Caucasian women, found the following ranges of dimensions:
 lengths (measured using rods): ;
 widths: ;
 introital diameters: 

A second study by the same group showed significant variations in size and shape between the vaginas of women of different ethnic groups. Both studies showed a wide range of vaginal shapes, described by the researchers as "Parallel sided, conical, heart,[...] slug" and "pumpkin seed" shapes. Barnhart et al., however, were not able to find any correlation amongst the race and the size of vagina. They were also unable to characterize the vaginal shape as a "heart, slug, pumpkin seed or parallel sides" as suggested by the previous studies.

Research published in 2006 by Barnhart et al., gave the following mean dimensions, based on MRI scans of 28 women:

 Mean length from cervix to introitus: .
 Mean width:
 at the proximal vagina: ; 
 at the pelvic diaphragm: ; 
 at the introitus: 

Medical devices 
Given the large range in vaginal dimensions noted in studies such as the above, many fitted vaginal devices, for example pessaries, do not adhere to a "one-size-fits-all" principle.

Sexual arousal 

See also 
 Vaginoplasty
 Vulval structure
 Vaginal health

References 

Anthropometry
Gynaecology
Obstetrics
Vagina